José Carrasco may refer to:
José Carrasco Torrico (1863–1921), Bolivian vice president 
José Carrasco Tapia (1943–1986), Chilean journalist 
José Carrasco (politician) (1944–2015), Peruvian politician
José Alirio Carrasco (born 1976), Colombian long-distance runner
José Antonio Carrasco (born 1980), Spanish cyclist
José Luis Carrasco (born 1982), Spanish cyclist
José Carrasco (footballer, born 1988), Spanish footballer
José Carrasco (volleyball) (born 1989), Venezuelan volleyball player
José Carrasco (footballer, born 1994), Spanish footballer

See also
San José de Carrasco, Uruguayan neighborhood